Courtney D. Fitzhugh is an American hematologist-oncologist and scientist. She is a clinical researcher and head of the laboratory of early sickle cell mortality prevention at the National Heart, Lung, and Blood Institute.

Life 
Fitzhugh was born in Los Angeles, California. completed a B.S. magna cum laude from the University of California, Los Angeles in 1996. She earned a M.D. from the University of California, San Francisco in 2001. After completing her M.D., Fitzhugh completed a joint residency in internal medicine and pediatrics at Duke University Medical Center, and in 2005 she did a combined adult hematology and pediatric hematology-oncology fellowship at the NIH and Johns Hopkins Hospital.

Fitzhugh returned to the NHLBI in 2007 and was appointed as assistant clinical investigator in 2012 and clinical tenure track investigator in 2016. She is a Lasker clinical research scholar and heads the NHLBI laboratory of early sickle mortality prevention. Her laboratory researches sickle cell disease and hematopoietic stem cell transplantation.

Fitzhugh is a member of the American Society of Hematology.

References 

Living people
Date of birth missing (living people)
Scientists from Los Angeles
University of California, Los Angeles alumni
University of California, San Francisco alumni
American hematologists
American oncologists
21st-century African-American physicians
21st-century American women scientists
Physician-scientists
African-American women physicians
National Institutes of Health people
Women hematologists
Women oncologists
21st-century American women physicians
21st-century American physicians
21st-century African-American women
Year of birth missing (living people)